The 1980 ABC Under-18 Championship was the sixth edition of the Asian Basketball Confederation (ABC)'s Junior Championship. The games were held at Bangkok, Thailand from November 1–12, 1980.

Venue
The games were held at National Stadium, located in Bangkok.

Preliminary round

Group A

Group B

Group C

Final round

Classification 13th–17th

Classification 7th–12th

Championship

Final standing

References

FIBA Asia Under-18 Championship
1980 in Asian basketball
International basketball competitions hosted by Thailand
November 1980 sports events in Asia